Stillborn Climax is the third album by death metal band Desecration. This album was produced under Trauma records and was the second of the band's albums to be banned on release.

Track listing
"Stillborn Climax"
"Incestual Sodomy"
"Obscene Publication"

Written by:
Paul Arlett
Glenn Thomas
Jason Jad Davies
John Young

1998 albums
Desecration (band) albums
Trauma Records albums